The Honda CBX is a six-cylinder motorcycle made from 1978 to 1982.

Honda CBX may also refer to Honda motorcycles whose model designations begin with the prefix CBX, including:

 Honda CBX750
 Honda CBX400F
 Honda CBX series - about Honda motorcycles prefixed "CBX"
 Honda CBX550F